Exposition Internationale d'Anvers was a World's Fair held in Antwerp, Belgium between 5 May and 5 November in 1894. It covered , attracted 3 million visits and made a profit. It took place at the same location as the Exposition Universelle d'Anvers, held in 1885.

Participating nations

There were several participating nations:
 German Empire
 Austro-Hungarian Empire
 Bulgaria
 China,
Congo,
Denmark,
Spain,
United States,
United Kingdom,
Greece,
Hungary,
Italy,
Luxembourg,
Mexico,
Persia,
Portugal,
Kingdom of Romania,
Russia,
the South African Republic (for which Gerard Jacob Theodoor Beelaerts van Blokland was Commissaire Général),
Switzerland and the Ottoman Empire.

There was also a joint presence from Sweden and Norway.

As well as Netherlands itself there were presentations of the Dutch East Indies including Java, parts of Sumatra and Madura.

Fair officials
Count Hippolyte d'Ursel was the commissioner general and Count de Pret Roose de Calesburg the president of the executive committee.

Prize
Walter MacEwen won a medal of honor (grand prize).

See also
Exposition Universelle d'Anvers held in Antwerp in 1885

References

External links
 1894 Antwerp - 14 links

World's fairs in Antwerp
1894 in Belgium
19th century in Antwerp